The Aurora, Texas, UFO incident reportedly occurred on April 17, 1897. According to a contemporary newspaper account, a UFO crashed on a farm near Aurora, Texas, resulting in the death of the extraterrestrial pilot. Supposedly, the alien was buried in the Aurora Cemetery.

Background

During the last two decades of the 19th century, there were reports from around the world of mysterious airships. In the United States, numerous newspaper accounts of airship sightings were published in late 1896 and early 1897. Some claimed that the occupants of the craft identified themselves as being from Mars.

Original report

An article written by S.E. Haydon and published in the Dallas Morning News on April 19, 1897, described the crash two days earlier of "the airship which has been sailing through the country." The craft suddenly appeared over Aurora at about 6 a.m. local time on April 17, 1897. It was "much nearer the earth than ever before", and "evidently some of the machinery was out of order". The ship subsequently "collided with the tower of Judge [J.S.] Proctor's windmill and went to pieces with a terrific explosion, scattering debris over several acres". The pilot, presumed to be the sole occupant, was killed. Examination of his remains indicated that "he was not an inhabitant of this world." T.J. Weems, from nearby Fort Worth, whom Haydon described as "the United States signal service officer at this place and an authority on astronomy," opined that the pilot was "a native of the planet Mars." A funeral was planned for the alien on April 20. Papers found on his body after the crash contained writings "in some unknown hieroglyphics," which, according to Haydon, appeared to record the pilot's travels. Haydon noted that the ship was made of "an unknown metal".

Later events

The alien was supposedly buried at the Aurora Cemetery nearby.  Reportedly, some wreckage from the crash was dumped into a well under the windmill, and some was buried with the pilot. A Texas Historical Commission marker posted outside of the Aurora Cemetery mentions the UFO incident, characterizing it as a "legend".

A brief Time magazine article on the Aurora incident, published in 1979, noted that Haydon's "tale ... was generally ridiculed at the time, and most citizens of Aurora still scoff". The article quoted 86-year-old Aurora resident Etta Pegues, who said that Haydon "wrote it as a joke and to bring interest to Aurora ... The railroad bypassed us, and the town was dying. ... Why, the judge never even had a windmill."

In popular culture 

The Aurora incident is satirized on The Firesign Theatre's 1974 comedy album Everything You Know Is Wrong.

The 1986 movie The Aurora Encounter is a dramatization of the Aurora incident.

Aurora (2019) is an independent short film co-written and co-directed by musician and historian Thomas Negovan and Aaron Shaps. It dramatizes the incident and combines it with the Nazi conspiracy theory Die Glocke.

The Aurora incident is a key plot point in the BBC Sounds science fiction audio drama The Cipher (2020).

See also
 List of reported UFO sightings

Notes

References

External links
 

1897 in the United States
UFO crashes
Wise County, Texas
UFO sightings in the United States
1897 in Texas
April 1897 events

de:UFO-Absturz in Aurora